Photoanimation is a filmmaking technique in which still photos, artwork, to other objects are filmed with the use of an animation stand.  as old as the motion picture industry.

Photoanimation techniques have been used from the very early days of motion pictures. Hollywood often leaned on this less expensive technique for some of its movie trailers in the classical era.

Usage

In making such films the soundtrack is first produced, analyzed and bar sheets made depicting the soundtrack details.  Exposure sheets for filming (camera exposures) are then abstracted from the bar sheets.

From the 1980s on, documentary filmmaker Ken Burns popularized a simpler, less complex form of photoanimation later called the Ken Burns effect.

References

Cinematic techniques
Animation techniques
Special effects